Sinezona bandeli is a species of minute sea snail, a marine gastropod mollusk in the family Scissurellidae.

Description

Distribution
This marine species occurs off New Zealand

References

Marshall B.A. 2002. Some recent scissurellids from the New Zealand region and remarks on some scissurellid genus group names (Mollusca: Gastropoda: Vetigastropoda). Molluscan Research 22(2): 165–181
 Spencer, H.G., Marshall, B.A. & Willan, R.C. 2009 Recent Mollusca. pp. 196–219 in: Gordon, D.P. (Ed.), The New Zealand inventory of biodiversity. 1. Kingdom Animalia: Radiata, Lophotrochozoa, Deuterostomia. Canterbury University Press, Christchurch 
 Geiger D.L. (2012) Monograph of the little slit shells. Volume 1. Introduction, Scissurellidae. pp. 1–728. Volume 2. Anatomidae, Larocheidae, Depressizonidae, Sutilizonidae, Temnocinclidae. pp. 729–1291. Santa Barbara Museum of Natural History Monographs Number 7.

Scissurellidae
Gastropods described in 2002